Events from the year 1699 in Denmark.

Incumbents
 Monarch – Christian V until 25 August, then Frederick IV.

Events
 The Kingo's hymnal is approved by the crown for use in Denmark–Norway.
 The Treaty of Preobrazhenskoye is signed.

Births
 8 March — Johan Friederich Wewer, merchant (died 1759)
 30 November — Christian VI of Denmark, (died 1746)

Deaths
 12 March — Peder Griffenfeld, statesman and royal favourite (born 1635)
 16 June — Constantin Marselis, nobleman (born 1647)
 25 August – Christian V of Denmark (born 1646)
 9 September – Kai Lykke, nobleman (born 1625)

References

 
Denmark
Years of the 17th century in Denmark